Binhai Boulevard (Chinese:滨海大道) is a major expressway in Shenzhen, China. It runs from Nanshan Boulevard in Nanshan and runs along much of the length of Shenzhen Bay Park and eventually joins Binhe Road when it ends at Futian. Over  of the road was built on land reclaimed from Shenzhen Bay. It is the southernmost major road in Shenzhen.

Notable sites along the road
Shenzhen Bay Park
OCT Bay

Gallery

See also
Shennan Road
Beihuan Boulevard

References

Roads in China
Nanshan District, Shenzhen
Transport in Shenzhen
Roads in Shenzhen